is a train station in Kobayashi, Miyazaki Prefecture, Japan. It is operated by JR Kyushu and is on the Kitto Line.

Lines

Layout 
The station consists of a side platform serving a single track at grade. There is no station building but a simple shed has been set up at the station entrance to serve as a waiting room. Parking and a bike shed are available at the station forecourt.

Adjacent stations

History
The station was opened by Japanese Government Railways (JGR) on 1 February 1929 as an additional station on the existing track of what it then designated as part of the Nippō Main Line. With the privatization of Japanese National Railways (JNR), the successor of JGR, on 1 April 1987, Nishi Kobayashi came under the control of JR Kyushu.

Passenger statistics
In fiscal 2016, the station was used by an average of 29 passengers (boarding only) per day.

See also
List of railway stations in Japan

References

External links

  

Railway stations in Miyazaki Prefecture
Railway stations in Japan opened in 1929